Elections to Trafford Council in the United Kingdom were held on 5 May 1988. One-third of the council was up for election, with each successful candidate to serve a four-year term of office, expiring in 1992. The Conservative party gained overall control of the council, from no overall control.

After the election, the composition of the council was as follows:

Ward results

References

1988 English local elections
1988
1980s in Greater Manchester